Urumqi Air is a low-cost airline headquartered in Ürümqi, Xinjiang Uyghur Autonomous Region, People's Republic of China. It operates scheduled passenger services. Its main hub is Ürümqi Diwopu International Airport in Ürümqi. The airline is one of the four founding members of the U-FLY Alliance. As of 2019, the airline exceeded eight million passengers and has operated an accumulated 150,000 flight hours.

Destinations

Fleet 

, the Urumqi Air fleet consists of the following aircraft:

References

External links

Official website 

Airlines of China
Airlines established in 2014
Chinese companies established in 2014
Companies based in Xinjiang
HNA Group
U-FLY Alliance
Low-cost carriers
Ürümqi